The Assistant Secretary of the Navy (Research, Development and Acquisition) (abbreviated ASN (RDA)) is a civilian office of the United States Department of the Navy.  The Assistant Secretary of the Navy (Research, Development and Acquisition) requires Senate confirmation, and engages in duties as directed by the United States Secretary of the Navy.

The office was created in 1990 by merging the duties of the Assistant Secretary of the Navy (Shipbuilding and Logistics) and the Assistant Secretary of the Navy (Research, Engineering and Systems). The Assistant Secretary of the Navy (Research, Development and Acquisition) is responsible for all of the acquisition functions and programs for the United States Navy and the United States Marine Corps, subject to the guidelines propounded by the Under Secretary of Defense for Acquisition, Technology and Logistics. The Assistant Secretary of the Navy (Research, Development and Acquisition) is also in charge of the Office of Naval Research.

Organization
 Principal Military Deputy (Research, Development and Acquisition)
 Principal Civilian Deputy (Research, Development and Acquisition)
 Deputy Assistant Secretaries of the Navy
 Deputy Assistant Secretary of the Navy (Acquisition and Procurement) – DASN AP
 Deputy Assistant Secretary of the Navy (Air) – DASN Air
 Deputy Assistant Secretary of the Navy (C4I and Space) – DASN C4I & Space
 Deputy Assistant Secretary of the Navy (Expeditionary Programs and Logistics Management) – DASN ELM
 Deputy Assistant Secretary of the Navy (International Programs) – DASN NIPO
 Deputy Assistant Secretary of the Navy (Management and Budget) – DASN M&B
 Deputy Assistant Secretary of the Navy (Research, Development, Test & Evaluation) – DASN RDT&E
 Deputy Assistant Secretary of the Navy (Ships) – DASN Ships
 Assistant General Counsel of the Navy (Research, Development and Acquisitions)
 SYSCOM Commanders
 Marine Corps Systems Command – MARCOR SYSCOM
 Naval Air Systems Command – NAVAIR
 Naval Facilities Engineering Command – NAVFAC
 Naval Sea Systems Command – NAVSEA
 Naval Supply Systems Command – NAVSUP
 Office of Naval Research – ONR
 Naval Information Warfare Systems Command – NAVWAR
 Program Executive Officers – PEOs
 PEO for the Joint Strike Fighter – PEO(JSF)
 PEO for Digital and Enterprise Services – PEO Digital
 PEO for Manpower, Logistics, and Business Solutions – PEO MLB
 PEO for C4I – PEO C4I
 PEO for Space Systems – PEO Space
 PEO for Littoral Combat Ships – PEO LCS
 PEO for Unmanned Aviation and Strike Weapons – PEO(UASW)
 PEO for Integrated Warfare Systems – PEO IWS
 Direct Reporting Program Manager for the Strategic Systems Program – DRPM SSP
 PEO for Submarines – PEO Subs
 PEO for Aircraft Carriers – PEO Carriers
 PEO for Ships – PEO Ships
 PEO for the Air ASW Assault, and Special Mission Programs – PEO(A)
 PEO for Tactical Air Programs – PEO(T)
 PEO for Land Systems – PEO Land

Assistant Secretaries of the Navy (Research, Development and Acquisitions), 1990—present

References

External links

 
 

Office of the Secretary of the Navy